Eldbjørg Løwer (born 14 July 1943) is a Norwegian politician for the Liberal Party.

Education 
Løwer was trained at the Norwegian National Academy of Craft and Art Industry.

Career 
Løwer was a ceramist.
Løwer began her career in politics and  served as mayor of Kongsberg and later leader of Kongsberg Chamber of commerce. 
Løwer was Minister of Planning and Coordination and Minister of Local Government and Labour (local government affairs) in 1997, Minister of Labour and Administration 1998-1999, and Minister of Defence 1999-2000.

Since 2011 she has chaired the Norwegian Parliamentary Intelligence Oversight Committee.

See also 
 Minister of Defence (Norway)

References

1943 births
Living people
Liberal Party (Norway) politicians
Oslo National Academy of the Arts alumni
Chairs of NRK
Female defence ministers
20th-century Norwegian women politicians
20th-century Norwegian politicians
People from Ål
Defence ministers of Norway
Women government ministers of Norway